In signal processing, direction of arrival (DOA) denotes the direction from which usually a propagating wave arrives at a point, where usually a set of sensors are located. These set of sensors forms what is called a sensor array. Often there is the associated technique of beamforming which is estimating the signal from a given direction. Various engineering problems addressed in the associated literature are:
Find the direction relative to the array where the sound source is located
Direction of different sound sources around you are also located by you using a process similar to those used by the algorithms in the literature
Radio telescopes use these techniques to look at a certain location in the sky
Recently beamforming has also been used in radio frequency (RF) applications such as wireless communication. Compared with the spatial diversity techniques, beamforming is preferred in terms of complexity. On the other hand, beamforming in general has much lower data rates. In multiple access channels (code-division multiple access (CDMA), frequency-division multiple access (FDMA), time-division multiple access (TDMA)), beamforming is necessary and sufficient
Various techniques for calculating the direction of arrival, such as angle of arrival (AoA), time difference of arrival (TDOA), frequency difference of arrival (FDOA), or other similar associated techniques.
Limitations on the accuracy of estimation of direction of arrival signals in digital antenna arrays are associated with jitter ADC and DAC.

Typical DOA estimation methods 
Periodogram
MUSIC
SAMV
Maximum likelihood
ESPRIT

References

Signal processing